Nick Sauer (born October 11, 1982) is a Republican politician and former member of the Illinois House of Representatives, representing the 51st district which includes Deer Park, Forest Lake, Green Oaks, Hawthorn Woods, Kildeer, Lake Barrington, Lake Zurich, Libertyville, Long Grove, Mundelein and North Barrington. Before his election to the House, he was a director of the Illinois State Toll Highway Authority and a member of the Lake County Board.

Professional and political career 
Sauer began his professional career in the US Department of Commerce under President George W Bush. In 2009, he was victorious in his first campaign for elected office, to the Barrington, Illinois Community School District 220 Board of Education. He successfully ran for the Lake County, Illinois Board in 2012 and was elected as a State Representative in 2016. He is a partner in his family's business, called "Sauer Kitchen Solutions."

Sexual harassment allegations 

On August 1, 2018, it was reported by Politico that an ex-girlfriend accused him of misappropriating nude photos she had sent to him privately, using them to establish an Instagram account, where he would pretend to be a woman seeking online relationships with men.  This allegedly involved graphic sexual discussions.  "He came to my house & confessed to catfishing men with my photos for 2 years to at least 8 men," she said, according to Politico. "He was unable to provide the names and begged that I let it go." He resigned from the Illinois General Assembly the same day. Lake County Republican Party Chairman Mark Shaw appointed Helene Walsh, wife of former Congressman Joe Walsh, to the vacancy.

On January 9, 2019, it was announced that Sauer was indicted on twelve counts of the offense of non-consensual Dissemination of Private Sexual Images involving two separate victims. As charged, each count is a Class 4 felony.

References

Living people
People from Peoria, Illinois
Northwestern University alumni
University of Denver alumni
Illinois Republicans
County board members in Illinois
People from Lake County, Illinois
1982 births
Illinois politicians convicted of crimes